Sammy Harkham (born May 21, 1980) is an American cartoonist and editor, best known for editing the Kramers Ergot alternative comics anthology.

His current work can be found in the comic Crickets, which was published by Drawn & Quarterly for its first two issues but is now self-published.

He is the co-owner of the Family Bookstore in Los Angeles, and the co-founder of Cinefamily (now known as Fairfax Cinema). His father is developer Uri Harkham.

Awards and honors
2002 Ignatz Award nominated for Promising New Talent
2012 Los Angeles Times Book Prize for Everything Together: Collected Stories

References

External links
 Family Bookstore blog
 Harkham interview, The Comics Journal

1980 births
Alternative cartoonists
American cartoonists
Living people
Artists from Los Angeles